Mary Claire "Mimi" Kennedy (born September 25, 1948) is an American actress, author, and activist. Best known for her roles in television sitcoms, Kennedy co-starred in numerous short-lived sitcoms before her role as Ruth Sloan on Homefront (1991–93). She received wider recognition with her roles in the Chuck Lorre created sitcoms; Dharma & Greg (1997–2002), and Mom (2013–2021). For her performance in the latter, Kennedy received a nomination for the Critics' Choice Television Award for Best Guest Performer in a Comedy Series. Kennedy has also appeared in various films, including; Pump Up the Volume (1990), Erin Brockovich (2000), In the Loop (2009), Due Date (2010), Midnight in Paris (2011), and The Five-Year Engagement (2012).

Early life
Kennedy was born in Rochester, New York, the daughter of Nancy Helen (née Colgan) and Daniel Gerald Kennedy. She got her start in theater with the Rochester Community Players, appearing in Agatha Christie's Spider Web in October 1960 when she was 12 years old. She was raised in Rochester, where she graduated in 1966 from Our Lady of Mercy High School. In the 1970s, she was in the musical Rhinegold, featuring songs by her friend Jim Steinman. She attended Smith College.

Career
Kennedy was a member of the cast of The National Lampoon Show, directed by John Belushi, who also starred in it. She auditioned for Saturday Night Live, but lost to Jane Curtin.

She appeared in the Broadway musical Grease, and in 1977 landed a part in the short-lived variety series 3 Girls 3, with Debbie Allen and Ellen Foley. She later played the role of Stockard Channing's sister in the short-lived Stockard Channing in Just Friends (1979), and she was a regular on The Big Show (1980). During the 1980s, she starred in a number of short-lived sitcoms, including The Two of Us (1981–82), Spencer (1984–85), and Family Man (1988). She also co-starred in the sitcom Joe's Life (1993).

Kennedy made her dramatic turn with a supporting role in the critically acclaimed Homefront. The series ran from 1991 to 1993. She later was a regular on Savannah (1996–97), playing the rich socialite mother of Shannon Sturges' character. After the series was canceled, she was cast in Pacific Palisades. This series also was canceled after a single season. In 1997, Kennedy returned to comedy roles playing Dharma's mother, Abby O'Neil, on the sitcom Dharma & Greg (1997-2002).

During the 2000s, Kennedy had many guest-starring roles on television, appearing on Grey's Anatomy, House, ER, Scandal, In Plain Sight, Drop Dead Diva, and Veep. She also had a number of supporting film roles, appearing in Man in the Chair, In the Loop, Due Date, Midnight in Paris and The Five-Year Engagement. In 2013, Kennedy joined the cast of the sitcom Mom playing Marjorie, the twelve-step sponsor of the lead characters. She received a Critics' Choice Television Award nomination for her performance on the show. She became a series regular on the second season.

Early in 2022, Kennedy posted a video in which she and spouse Larry Dilg recall their friendships with Jim Steinman and, by extension, with Meatloaf. In the video, Kennedy shares details of her months touring with the National Lampoon Show.

Personal life
Kennedy is involved in several progressive activist causes, including Progressive Democrats of America for which she serves as chairperson of the board. She is a regular contributor to the LA Progressive. Her mid-life memoir Taken to the Stage: The Education of an Actress was published by Smith & Kraus in 1996,

Filmography

Film

Television

Awards and nominations

References

External links

 LA Progressive

1948 births
20th-century American actresses
21st-century American actresses
American film actresses
American television actresses
Living people
Writers from Rochester, New York
Smith College alumni
Actresses from Rochester, New York
California Democrats
New York (state) Democrats